The 1983 winners of the Torneo di Viareggio (in English, the Viareggio Tournament, officially the Viareggio Cup World Football Tournament Coppa Carnevale), the annual youth football tournament held in Viareggio, Tuscany, are listed below.

Format
The 16 teams are seeded in 4 groups. Each team from a group meets the others in a single tie. The winner of each group progress to the final knockout stage.

Participating teams
Italian teams

  Catanzaro
  Cesena
  Fiorentina
  Inter Milan
  Juventus
  Lazio
  Milan
  Pisa
  Roma

European teams

  Ipswich Town
  Dukla Praha
  Warszawa
  Partizan Beograd

American teams

  CD Universidad Católica
  Palmeiras

African teams
  Algeria

Group stage

Group A

Group B

Group C

Group D

Knockout stage

Champions

Footnotes

External links
 Official Site (Italian)
 Results on RSSSF.com

1983
1982–83 in Italian football
1982–83 in Yugoslav football
1982–83 in Czechoslovak football
1982–83 in English football
1982–83 in Polish football
1982–83 in Algerian football
1983 in Brazilian football
1983 in Chilean football